Barbara "Barb" Marois (born March 1, 1963 in Auburn, Massachusetts) is a former field hockey player from the United States, who was a member of the US women's team that finished fifth at the 1996 Summer Olympics in Atlanta, Georgia.

References

 USA Field Hockey Hall of Fame profile

External links
 

1963 births
Living people
American female field hockey players
Field hockey players at the 1988 Summer Olympics
Field hockey players at the 1996 Summer Olympics
Olympic field hockey players of the United States
People from Auburn, Massachusetts
Sportspeople from Maine
Sportspeople from Worcester County, Massachusetts
New Hampshire Wildcats field hockey players
People from York, Maine
Pan American Games silver medalists for the United States
Pan American Games bronze medalists for the United States
Pan American Games medalists in field hockey
Field hockey players at the 1987 Pan American Games
Field hockey players at the 1991 Pan American Games
Field hockey players at the 1995 Pan American Games
Medalists at the 1987 Pan American Games
Medalists at the 1991 Pan American Games
Medalists at the 1995 Pan American Games